Aldo Buzzi (10 August 1910 – 9 October 2009) was an author and architect.

Born in Como, Italy, Buzzi graduated from the Milan School of Architecture in 1938. Though primarily an author of travel and gastronomy books, he also worked as an architect; as assistant director, scene writer, and screenwriter for various film production companies in the former Yugoslavia, and in Rome, Italy, and France. He edited the following films: La Kermesse héroïque, Ridolini e la collana della suocera e Ridolini esploratore, and Sette anni di guai, all produced by Editoriale Domus, 1945.

Publications

 Taccuino dell'aiuto-regista (1944)
 Quando la pantera rugge (1972)
 Piccolo diario americano, illustrated by Saul Steinberg (1974)
 L'uovo alla kok: ricette, curiosita (1979)
 Viaggio in Terra delle mosche e altri viaggi (1994); translated into English by Ann Goldstein and published as Journey to the Land of the Flies (1996)
 Cechov a Sondrio (1991)
 A Weakness for Almost Everything (1999); translated by Ann Goldstein
 The Perfect Egg and Other Secrets (2005); translated by Guido Waldman, illustrated by Saul Steinberg
 Parliamo d'altro (2006)

Aldo Buzzi is listed with Luigi Chiarini, Director of The Centro Sperimentale del Cinema, Rome, as one of the assistant directors of Love in The City (1953), the pioneering Neorealist episode film initiated and produced by Cesare Zavattini, together with Riccardo Ghione and Marco Ferrero (who directed La Grande Bouffe in the 1970s). Two of the episodes were directed by Federico Fellini (whom Buzzi had already worked with) and Alberto Lattuada. (Buzzi was married to Lattuada's sister). Gillo Pontecovorvo, who later directed The Battle of Algiers, combining documentary with a fictional treatment, was also an assistant director on the film.

Architects from Lombardy
1910 births
2009 deaths